Billboard Japan Music Awards are an annual set of music awards, founded by Billboard Japan, the Japanese online edition of the music magazine Billboard.

The awards honor artists, both Japanese and foreign, who had achieved best results in Billboard Japan charts during the year. Different awards are based on different formulas, combining both chart data and votes from the public. The main award, Artist of the Year, is determined solely by popular vote.

The awards are given at an annual awards show featuring performances by celebrated artists. The first awards ceremony was held in 2010.

Award categories 
 Music categories
 Billboard Japan Hot 100 of the Year (2009–present)
 Billboard Japan Hot Albums of the Year (2015–present)
 Billboard Japan Top Single Sales of the Year (2009–present)
 Billboard Japan Hot Animation of the Year (2011–present)
 Billboard Japan Hot Overseas of the Year (2014–present)
 Billboard Japan Top Albums Sales of the Year (2009–present)
 Billboard Japan Top Jazz Albums of the Year (2009–present)
 Billboard Japan Streaming Songs of the Year (2017–present)
 Billboard Japan Download Songs of the Year (2017–present)
 Billboard Japan Download Albums of the Year (2017–present)

 Artist categories
 Billboard Japan Artist of the Year (2009–present)
 Billboard Japan Top Pop Artist (2009–present)
 Billboard Japan Jazz Artist of the Year (2009–present)
 Billboard Japan Classic Artist of the Year (2009–present)
 Billboard Japan Animation Artist of the Year (2011–present)
 Billboard Japan Independent Artist of the Year (2009–present)

 Past categories
 Billboard Japan Digital and Airplay Overseas of the Year (2011–2014)
 Billboard Japan Adult Contemporary of the Year (2009–2014)
 Billboard Japan Independent of the Year (2009–2014)
 Billboard Japan Overseas Soundtrack Albums (2009–2014)
 Billboard Japan Radio Songs of the Year (2009–2016)
 Billboard Japan Top Classical Albums of the Year (2009–2016)
 Billboard Japan Top Jazz Albums of the Year (2009–2016)

Award ceremonies 
The awards ceremony has taken place in December–February.
The 2009 and 2010 awards were broadcast on Fuji TV Next, since 2011 on Osaka TV and Tokyo TV.

Presenters 
 2009: Tokoaki Ogura, Kyōko Kamei, Mibu Minami
 2010: Tokoaki Ogura, Kyōko Kamei, Maria Okada
 2011: Christopher Peppler, Keiko Yashio
 2012: Yūji Miyake, Chiaki Horan
 2013: Yūji Miyake, Chiaki Horan

Award recipients

Major awards

Special awards

See also 
 Billboard Music Awards

References

External links 
 Billboard Japan website

Japan
Awards established in 2010
2010 establishments in Japan
Japanese music awards